Novakiella is a genus of South Pacific orb-weaver spiders containing the single species, Novakiella trituberculosa that has only been found in Australia and New Zealand.

Taxonomy
The genus Novakiella was first described by N. Court & Forster in 1993 as a replacement name for Novakia. The sole species N. trituberculosa was originally placed in the now obsolete genus Epeira as E. tri-tuberculata. Carl Friedrich Roewer temporarily moved it to Araneus while dissolving this "catch-all" taxon, and it was later placed into its own genus, Novakia, later renamed to Novakiella.

References

Araneidae
Monotypic Araneomorphae genera
Spiders of Australia
Spiders of New Zealand